Bebearia flaminia, the Flaminia forester, is a butterfly in the family Nymphalidae. It is found in Nigeria, Cameroon, Equatorial Guinea, the Republic of the Congo, the Central African Republic, the Democratic Republic of the Congo and western Uganda. The habitat consists of forests.

The larvae feed on an unidentified dicotyledonous bush.

Subspecies
Bebearia flaminia flaminia (eastern Nigeria, Cameroon, Equatorial Guinea, Congo, Central African Republic, western Uganda: Semuliki National Park, Democratic Republic of the Congo: Ubangi, Mongala, Uele, north Kivu, Tshopo, Equateur, Sankuru and Lualaba)
Bebearia flaminia leventisi Hecq & Larsen, 1997 (western Nigeria)

References

Butterflies described in 1891
flaminia
Butterflies of Africa